Obukhov State Plant (also known Obukhovski Plant)  is a major Russian metallurgy and heavy machine-building plant in St. Petersburg, Russia.

History

The factory was founded in 1863 to produce naval artillery based on German designs by Krupp. It has since been a major producer of artillery and other military equipment. V. Volodarsky was assassinated when making his way to a meeting relating to industrial unrest in the factory. From 1922 to 1992 it was renamed Bolshevik Plant no. 232.

In the late 1920s, it became one of the two main Soviet tank factories (along with the Kharkov Locomotive Factory), and produced the first domestic tank, the T-18. It later became home to the AVO-5 tank design bureau, soon named OKMO,  which was responsible for the T-26 infantry tank. In 1932, the tank department of the Bolshevik factory, became the new Factory No. 174 (K.E. Voroshilov). This new, independent enterprise was dedicated to the production of T-26.

Janusz Magnuski says that in 1935 one of the former departments of the Bolshevik factory became a base for the new independent "Factory No. 185 (S.M. Kirov)".  The OKMO, for a few months a part of Factory No. 174, moved at the same time to Factory No. 185. The new enterprise was also dedicated to the production of tanks, and because of its honorific is often confused with Kirov Factory. The main part of Bolshevik Factory remained focused on production of heavy artillery. On the other hand, Zaloga says that in 1935, after the assassination of Sergey Kirov, the whole Bolshevik Factory No. 232 was renamed "Factory No. 185 (S.M. Kirov)", yet Leningrad inhabitants continued to refer to it as the Bolshevik Factory.

The Leningrad factory's historical name was restored in 1992 by the formation of a unitary enterprise, FSUE Obukhov State Plant. In 2002 it became part of the Almaz-Antey military industrial concern, and in 2003, it became a joint-stock company, OJSC GOZ Obukhov Plant.

See also
First Russian Society of Communist Agricultural Workers, founded by workers from the Obukhov factory

References

External links

 Official webpage of the OJSC "GOZ Obukhov Plant"
 Description of 305 mm naval guns manufactured by Obukhov

Buildings and structures in Saint Petersburg
Manufacturing companies based in Saint Petersburg
Manufacturing companies of the Soviet Union
Companies established in 1863
Defence companies of the Soviet Union
Almaz-Antey